Periampullary cancer is a cancer that forms near the ampulla of Vater, an enlargement of the ducts from the liver and pancreas where they join and enter the small intestine. It consists of:

 ampullary tumour from ampulla of Vater
 cancer of lower common bile duct
 duodenal cancer adjacent to ampulla
 carcinoma head of pancreas 

It presents with painless jaundice which may have waxing and waning nature because at times the sloughing of the tumor tissue relieves the obstruction partially.

Signs and symptoms of periampullary cancer

 Jaundice (yellowing of skin, eyes and urine with pale stools)
 Itching
 Abdominal pain
 Weight loss and loss of appetite
 Recurrent vomiting
 Black stools
 Anaemia

Treatment 
The treatment depends upon the stage of the disease and degree of jaundice. Surgery is the best possible option and can be considered if the cancer is diagnosed at a stage where it can be completely removed by surgery. If the jaundice is very high, your surgeon may choose to decrease jaundice before surgery by doing a procedure called endoscopic retrograde cholangiopancreatography (ERCP) and stenting. In this, a plastic or metallic tube called stent is placed in the bile duct which is blocked by tumour and opens it up from inside.

If the tumour is advanced, then he may also give you neoadjuvant treatment (chemotherapy or chemoradiotherapy) to decrease the size of the tumour and then resect it to increase your chances of survival.

For unresectable tumours, an attempt to made to downstage them to a stage where they can be surgically removed. For this neoadjuvant treatment is administered and some of these patients will become operable.

Surgery 
The operation to surgically remove periampullary cancer is called Whipple operation, also known as pancreaticoduodenectomy. In this, head of the pancreas is removed along with duodenum, bile duct, gall bladder, part of the stomach, a small part of the small intestine and adjacent lymph nodes. To restore gastrointestinal continuity, the small intestine is then joined to the pancreas (sometimes pancreas is joined to the stomach), remaining bile duct and stomach.

Notes 

Digestive system neoplasia